Hiatodoris is a genus of sea slugs, specifically dorid nudibranchs. They are marine gastropod molluscs in the family Discodorididae.

Species
Species so far described in this genus include:

Hiatodoris fellowsi (Kay & Young, 1969)

References

Discodorididae